David Kickert (born 16 March 1994) is an Austrian professional ice hockey goaltender who is currently playing for EC Red Bull Salzburg of the ICE Hockey League (ICEHL). He also plays in the Austrian national team.

References

External links

1994 births
Living people
Augsburger Panther players
Austrian ice hockey goaltenders
EHC Black Wings Linz players
People from Korneuburg
EC Red Bull Salzburg players
Vienna Capitals players
EC VSV players
Sportspeople from Lower Austria